Hacınuhlu  is a village in Mut district of  Mersin Province, Turkey. It is about situated in the slopes of Toros Mountains facing the Göksu River valley. The population of the Hacınuhlu was 370 as of 2012. Olive is the main product of the village.

References

Villages in Mut District